The Blindness of Devotion is a lost 1915 silent film drama directed by J. Gordon Edwards and starring Robert B. Mantell and Genevieve Hamper. It was produced and distributed by Fox Film Corporation.

Cast
Robert B. Mantell - Count de Carnay
Genevieve Hamper - Renee Delacroix
Stuart Holmes - Pierre Caveraux
Claire Whitney - Bella
Henry Leone -
Charles Young - 
Jack Standing -

See also
1937 Fox vault fire

References

External links

kinotv.com

1915 films
American silent feature films
Films directed by J. Gordon Edwards
American black-and-white films
Lost American films
Fox Film films
Silent American drama films
1915 drama films
1915 lost films
Lost drama films
1910s American films